is a Japanese video game company based in Sapporo, Japan.

History
The company started by producing a few titles for the Sharp X68000 system, and then for other console systems. In April 1993, Zoom established a joint venture with Imagineer. However, Imagineer-Zoom was disbanded in January 1995 because of poor performance. Dolucky is the most notable game series published by Imagineer. They developed some fighting games such as Zero Divide and Rurouni Kenshin: Ishin Gekitōhen.

The company's mascot is a cat named NECO, whose first appearance was on the Genocide game intro and manual. In the Dolucky video game series, the mascot appears as the main character. It also appears in the Zero Divide titles.

Games

Genocide, Sharp X68000 (1989)
Lagoon, Sharp X68000 (1990)
Phalanx, Sharp X68000 (1991)
Genocide 2: Master of the Dark Communion, Sharp X68000 (1991)
Overtake, Sharp X68000 (1992)
Genocide Square, FM Towns (1992)
Dolucky no Kusayakiu, Super Famicom (1993)
Dolucky's A-League Soccer, Super Famicom (1994)
Dolucky no Puzzle Tour '94, Super Famicom (1994)
Zero Divide, PlayStation (1995)
Rurouni Kenshin: Ishin Gekitōhen, PlayStation (1996)
Zero Divide 2: The Secret Wish, PlayStation (1997)
Zero Divide: The Final Conflict, Sega Saturn (1997)
CART Flag to Flag (known in Japan as Super Speed Racing), Dreamcast (1999)
Mister Mosquito, PlayStation 2 (2001)
Mister Mosquito 2, PlayStation 2 (2003)
Fantastic Tambourine, WiiWare (2009)
Phalanx, WiiWare (2009)
Fantasic Cube, WiiWare (2010)

References

External links
  
 Zoom profile at GameFAQs

Video game companies established in 1988
Companies based in Sapporo
Mass media in Sapporo
Video game companies of Japan
Video game development companies
Video game publishers
Japanese companies established in 1988